Francis Austin (1829–1905) was a Anglo-Guyanese clergyman.

Francis Austin may also refer to:

Francis Austin (cricketer) (1882–1938), Barbadian cricketer
Francis B. Austin House, a historic house in Boston, Massachusetts

See also
Francis Austen (1774–1865), Royal Navy officer
Frank Austin (disambiguation)